Meriem Moussa (born May 11, 1988) is an Algerian judoka, who played for the extra-lightweight category.

She was a four-time medalist at the African Judo Championships, and a gold medalist at the 2007 All-Africa Games in Algiers. She also won two bronze medals in the same division at the 2007 Summer Universiade in Bangkok, Thailand, and at the 2011 Summer Universiade in Shenzhen, China.

Moussa represented Algeria at the 2008 Summer Olympics in Beijing, where she competed for the women's extra-lightweight class (48 kg). She defeated Gabon's Sandrine Ilendou in the first preliminary round, before losing out her next match by a waza-ari (half-point) to Germany's Michaela Baschin.

In October 2011, Moussa refused to compete against Israeli Shahar Levi in the knockout round of the Judo World Cup in Rome, Italy.

See also
Boycotts of Israel in individual sports

References

External links
 
 
 
 NBC Olympics Profile

Algerian female judoka
Living people
Olympic judoka of Algeria
Judoka at the 2008 Summer Olympics
1988 births
African Games gold medalists for Algeria
African Games medalists in judo
Universiade medalists in judo
Competitors at the 2018 Mediterranean Games
Competitors at the 2007 All-Africa Games
Universiade bronze medalists for Algeria
Competitors at the 2019 African Games
African Games bronze medalists for Algeria
Medalists at the 2007 Summer Universiade
Medalists at the 2011 Summer Universiade
Mediterranean Games competitors for Algeria
21st-century Algerian people